The 2017 Annapolis mayoral election was held on November 7, 2017 to elect the mayor of Annapolis, Maryland. Mike Pantelides, the incumbent mayor, ran for a second term as Mayor. Democratic nominee Gavin Buckley won the election with 61.06% of the vote, becoming the city's next mayor.

Results

References

Annapolis
Annapolis
Annapolis
Mayoral elections in Annapolis, Maryland